Joulaki District is a district (bakhsh) in Aghajari County, Khuzestan Province, Iran. At the 2011 census, its population was 5,413 people in 1,264 families.  The district has no cities. The district has two rural districts (dehestan): Ab Baran Rural District and Sar Joulaki Rural District.

References 

Aghajari County
Districts of Khuzestan Province